Pelican is an unincorporated community in DeSoto Parish, Louisiana, United States. Pelican has a post office with ZIP code 71063.

References

Unincorporated communities in DeSoto Parish, Louisiana
Unincorporated communities in Louisiana
Unincorporated communities in Shreveport – Bossier City metropolitan area